The Stupid Cupid is a 1944 Warner Bros. Looney Tunes animated cartoon directed by Frank Tashlin. The cartoon was released on November 25, 1944, and stars Daffy Duck and Elmer Fudd.

Plot
Elmer Fudd plays Cupid (still wearing his trademark hat) laughing and shooting arrows at male animals so they fall in love with the next female they see, even if of a different species (e.g., a dog falls in love with a cat he is chasing, making the cat commit suicide using a gun, after which all of his nine lives die). This cartoon features Daffy singing the 1944 Lawrence Welk hit song "Don't Sweetheart Me". Elmer tries to shoot Daffy Duck while bathing in a water trough. Daffy complains of the last time he was shot, which ended with him being forced into marriage and the father of many ducklings (including Siamese twins), producing photos of them. Daffy stuffs Elmer into his own hat and shoots him away with his own bow. As Elmer recovers, he again laughs, only far more ominously.

Later, Elmer, still laughing dementedly and determined to avenge his treatment by Daffy, shoots a giant arrow to Daffy, crashing through several hen houses and causing Daffy to fall in love with a married hen. Her rooster husband furiously confronts Daffy, who declares it a mishap, claiming to be a family man himself (briefly appearing with a jalopy full of the previously mentioned ducklings). The rooster lets Daffy go, but Elmer shoots him yet again, starting the whole process all over again.

Notes

Voice acting
Elmer is ordinarily voiced by Arthur Q. Bryan, but since the character has no dialogue in this cartoon, Frank Graham provides Elmer's laugh.

Elmer reprises his role as Cupid in the Tiny Toon Adventures episode "Spring in Acme Acres" (originally aired Nov. 6 1990). In the segment "Love Among the Toons", he tricks dullard Concord Condor into temporarily taking over his job, with predictably chaotic results.

Lost ending
When this cartoon was reissued, a "Blue Ribbon" title card was added to the opening sequence, and an ending scene is believed to have been removed. Theories speculate the cartoon originally had the special ending theme before the Blue Ribbon reissue rather than a fade out. This can only be proven with an original print.

According to historian Greg Ford, when Daffy is stuck between a hen and a rooster who is inadvertently kissing him at the end of the short, Daffy originally turned to face the audience, saying "If you haven't tried it, don't knock it." It is unknown if this gag was removed from the release print or the Blue Ribbon reissue.

Reception
Animation historian Martin Goodman writes, "Though this farcical short contains some shoddy animation, Frank Tashlin's imaginative direction and Warren Foster's hilarious dialogue lift The Stupid Cupid above its shortcomings and into the realm of unforgettable comedy. As usual, Tashlin approaches his cartoon as a cinematic tableau in which wildly distorted characters experience exaggerated emotions... Outstanding timing, gags, and dialogue dominate the entire short."

Home media
VHS - Daffy Duck Cartoon Festival featuring "Daffy Duck and the Dinosaur"
Laserdisc - The Golden Age of Looney Tunes Vol. 2
DVD - Looney Tunes Golden Collection: Volume 4, Disc 2

References

External links

1944 animated films
1944 films
Looney Tunes shorts
Daffy Duck films
Elmer Fudd films
Short films directed by Frank Tashlin
1940s American animated films
Films scored by Carl Stalling
1940s English-language films